Saleh Khalid Mohammed Al-Shehri (born 1 November 1993) is a Saudi Arabian professional footballer player who plays as a striker for Al-Hilal and the Saudi Arabia national team. On 22 November 2022, Saleh scored the first goal for Saudi Arabia against Argentina at the FIFA World Cup 2022 held in Qatar.

Club career

Early career
Saleh is a graduate of the Academy of Al-Ahli and played as a striker in the ranks of Al-Ahli junior and youth.

Beira-Mar
Saleh made his debut on 2 September 2012 at Beira-Mar against Moreirense and he scored the first goal for his first match. Saleh is the first Saudi Arabian to score in Europe. At his second match against Vitória, he scored the fastest goal in Primeira Liga 12–13. Saleh played two matches and scored two goals with S.C. Beira-Mar.

Return to Al-Ahli
On 20 July 2013, Saleh returned to his club. He made his debut friendly match against Najran and losing the match score 1–0.

International career

Youth 
Saleh scored a goal against Qatar national under-20 team in the 2012 AFC U-19 Championship, with Saudi Arabia winning 4–2. Saudi Arabia collected four points, but were eliminated after finishing third.

Career statistics

Club

International
Statistics accurate as of match played 30 November 2022.

Scores and results list Saudi Arabia's goal tally first.

Honours
Al-Hilal
Saudi Professional League: 2019–20, 2020–21, 2021–22
King Cup: 2019–20
AFC Champions League: 2019, 2021
 Saudi Super Cup: 2021

References

External links
 

1993 births
Living people
Sportspeople from Jeddah
Saudi Arabian footballers
Saudi Arabia youth international footballers
Saudi Arabia international footballers
Association football forwards
Primeira Liga players
C.D. Mafra players
S.C. Beira-Mar players
Saudi Arabian expatriate footballers
Expatriate footballers in Portugal
Saudi Arabian expatriate sportspeople in Portugal
Footballers at the 2014 Asian Games
Al-Raed FC players
Al-Ahli Saudi FC players
Al Hilal SFC players
Saudi Professional League players
Asian Games competitors for Saudi Arabia
20th-century Saudi Arabian people
21st-century Saudi Arabian people
2022 FIFA World Cup players